Michael John Palmer (born 6 November 1935) is a British middle-distance runner. He competed in the men's 3000 metres steeplechase at the 1960 Summer Olympics.

References

1935 births
Living people
Athletes (track and field) at the 1960 Summer Olympics
British male middle-distance runners
British male steeplechase runners
Olympic athletes of Great Britain
Place of birth missing (living people)